is a 1989 Japanese film directed by Toshio Masuda.

Cast
Ken Ogata
Yukiyo Toake
Kōichi Satō
Mariko Fuji
Miyuki Imori
Hideko Yoshida
Yōko Nogiwa
Issey Ogata
Eiichiro Funakoshi
Jun Negami
Hōsei Komatsu
Kazuo Kitamura
Takeshi Katō
Hideo Takamatsu as Okabe Kensuke
Tadao Nakamaru
Shinsuke Ashida
Tōru Emori
Tomisaburo Wakayama

Awards
14th Hochi Film Award
 Best Director - Toshio Masuda
 Best Supporting Actress - Hideko Yoshida

References

External links
 

1989 films
Films directed by Toshio Masuda
1980s Japanese films